Independent Division of Guizhou Provincial Military District(2nd Formation) was formed on July 16, 1979. The division was composed of three infantry regiments and an artillery regiment.

The Guizhou Provincial Military District appears to have been part of the Chengdu Military Region. 

The division maintained as an Army Division, Catalogue B, composing of 6961 personnel.

The division was disbanded on January 15, 1981.

References

Independent divisions of the People's Liberation Army
Military units and formations established in 1979
Military units and formations disestablished in 1981